Lane Tech College Prep High School (often shortened to Lane Tech, full name Albert Grannis Lane Technical College Preparatory High School), is a public 4-year selective enrollment magnet high school located in the Roscoe Village neighborhood on the north side of Chicago, Illinois, United States. It is a part of the Chicago Public Schools district. Lane is one of the oldest schools in the city and has an enrollment of over four thousand students, making it the largest high school in Chicago. Lane is a selective-enrollment-based school in which students must take a test and pass a certain benchmark in order to be offered admission. Lane is one of eleven selective enrollment schools in Chicago. It is a diverse school with many of its students coming from different ethnicities and economic backgrounds. In 2019, Lane Tech was rated the 3rd best public high school in Illinois and 69th in the nation.

School history

Founding

The school is named after Albert G. Lane, a former principal and superintendent of Chicago Public Schools from 1891 until 1898. It was founded in 1908 and dedicated on Washington's Birthday in 1909, as the Albert Grannis Lane Manual Training High School. It originally stood at Sedgwick Avenue and Division Street. During the early years of the school's operation, the school was a manual training school for boys, where students could take advantage of a wide array of technical classes. Freshmen were offered carpentry, cabinet making, and wood turning. Sophomores received training in foundry, forge, welding, coremaking, and molding. Juniors could take classes in the machine shop. Seniors were able to take electric shop which was the most advanced shop course.

By the 1930s, Lane had a student population of over 7,000 boys. Since the school's building was not originally planned for such a huge student population, a new site for the school was chosen, and the building was designed by Board of Education architect John C. Christensen.  On its dedication day, September 17, 1934, the student body—over 9,000 boys—and faculty gathered at Wrigley Field and from there walked en masse several miles west to the new campus. (In 1983 and 2008, to celebrate the 75th and 100th anniversaries of the school, a march was held from the school to Wrigley Field.) Lane's huge student body necessitated that classes be held in three shifts. That year (1934), the school name was changed to the Albert Grannis Lane Technical High School to reflect the school's expanding curriculum, but was known to all simply as "Lane Tech."  In 2004, the school name was changed to Lane Technical College Prep High School to reflect a college preparatory mandate.

Student admission during the Cold War
Lane adopted a closed admission policy in 1958 on the school's 50th anniversary. All remedial classes were eliminated and only top tier students were admitted to the school. This coincided with the beginning of the space race between the United States and the USSR. Lane changed its educational policy to help ensure that the United States would not fall behind the Soviets in science and technology.

Admission of female students
In 1971, changes were made to the admission policy due to a drop in enrollment and lack of technical schools for girls. To solve the issue, Superintendent James Redmond recommended that girls be admitted to Lane Tech. The Chicago Board of Education concurred and girls were admitted as students for the first time. Due to a fear of having a drop in academic achievement, 1,500 male students protested the admission but the decision was not changed.

Campus

Lane Tech is located on a  campus at the intersection of Addison Street and Western Avenue in Chicago, Illinois. The campus includes: the main school building, Lane Stadium, Kerry Wood Cubs Field, a turf soccer field, and the parking lot.

Lane Stadium
During the spring 2007 season, Chicago city building inspectors declared Lane Stadium unsafe and condemned the eastern half of the stadium. The age of the stadium and the fact it was built on landfill raised concerns that using the stadium to full capacity would cause a structural collapse. Events affected were the 2007–2014 graduating class ceremonies (moved to the UIC Pavilion located at the University of Illinois at Chicago), the annual Letterman versus Faculty Softball game, the annual Memorial Day assembly, and the 2007, 2008, and 2009 Pep Rally. Lane Stadium reopened September 7, 2007, with a new turf field. The stadium also features a new IHSA regulation track.

Memorial Garden
At the west end of the Memorial Garden is the Ramo I. Zenkich Memorial, consisting of a flag pole and granite monument inscribed with the names of the students from Lane Tech who lost their lives in the Vietnam War. The Memorial Garden was rededicated in 1995. During the school's 90th anniversary celebration in 1998, a commemorative plaque was placed near the "Shooting the Stars" statue. It explains the significance of the Memorial Garden to Lane Tech and its students.

Academics
Honor level courses are offered to qualified students. Advanced Placement (AP) courses are available in English, history, math, science, art, music, computer science, and world languages. Students can also replace their normal physical education classes with a class in Junior Reserve Officers' Training Corps (JROTC). The program sponsors the Proctors Club, Color Guard, Honor Guard, Drill Platoon, Drum & Bugle Corps, and Raiders of Lane. As of 2018, Lane has a 94% graduation rate.

As of 2018, 94% of Lane students take at least one AP class throughout their time at Lane.

Lane offers courses in Aquaponics and is the only Chicago Public School to do so.

Lane Tech has the most graduates who complete PhD's in the nation as of 2018.

Lane Tech has the biggest computer science program in Chicago Public Schools, and is considered one of the best schools in computer science in the United States.

Athletics
Lane offers many sports including, but not limited to baseball, basketball, bowling, cheerleading, cross-country, football, golf, ice hockey, lacrosse, soccer, softball, swimming, tennis, track, volleyball, wrestling, women's rugby, and water polo. Lane garners, on average, 7–10 city-championships per year and has won 16 state championships since 1908. Numerous Lane Tech athletes have competed beyond the high school level and achieved success at the college level and beyond.

In 1934 the NFL-champion Chicago Bears held their practices for the Chicago College All-Star Game at Lane Tech.

Notable alumni
 Tony Alcantar is an actor and acting teacher.
 Leonard Baldy was a pioneering Chicago police officer and helicopter traffic reporter.
 Franz Benteler was a classical violinist and leader of the Royal Strings Orchestra.
 Edgar Bergen was a ventriloquist, actor, and radio performer, best remembered for creating Charlie McCarthy.
 Rod Blagojevich is a former Governor of Illinois (attended for a short time before transferring).
 Aimee Boorman is a gymnastics coach who was the head coach of the Final Five at the 2016 Summer Olympics. Boorman was the personal coach of Simone Biles.
 Cyron Brown is a former lineman who played in the NFL and AFL.
 Buzz Capra is a former Major League Baseball pitcher (1971–77).
 Phil Cavarretta was a Major League Baseball player (1934–55).  He spent most of his playing career with, and briefly managed the Chicago Cubs.
 Ertharin Cousin is executive director of the United Nations World Food Programme.
 Len Church was a pitcher for the Chicago Cubs (1966).
 Bill Daily was an actor (I Dream of Jeannie, The Bob Newhart Show).
 Frank Dasso was a Major League Baseball pitcher for the Cincinnati Reds (1945–46).
 Anna Davlantes has been a news anchor at WMAQ-TV and WFLD-TV.
 Otto Denning was a Major League Baseball catcher for the Cleveland Indians (1942–43).
 DJ Colette (Colette Marino) is a house music singer and DJ.
 George J. Efstathiou is an architect at Skidmore, Owings and Merrill (Burj Khalifa, Chicago Symphony Center).
 Dan Evans is a former General Manager of the Los Angeles Dodgers and a baseball executive, Class of 1978.
 John Felske is a former Major League Baseball player and manager.
 Bill Fischer was a lineman for the Chicago Cardinals (1949–53).  A member of the College Football Hall of Fame, he won the Outland Trophy in 1948.
Michael Flanagan, class of 1980, is a former congressman.
 Neal Gabler is an author and political commentator.
 Theaster Gates is an American Social Practice installation artist.
 Carl Giammarese is a singer and guitarist who co-founded The Buckinghams.
 Earl Gillespie was a sports broadcaster for the Milwaukee Braves and Green Bay Packers
 Godfrey is a comedian and actor.
 Fred Goetz, mobster implicated in the Saint Valentine's Day massacre.
 Ron Gora was a swimmer who competed in the 1952 Summer Olympics.
 Bato Govedarica is a former player for the Syracuse Nationals (1953–54).
 Seymour Greenberg was a national champion tennis player.
 Dwight D. Guilfoil Jr., manufacturing executive, advocate for disabled workers
 Herbert Hans Haupt was a Nazi spy during World War II executed by U.S. Government for his role in Operation Pastorius.
 Dennis Hejhal is a mathematician at the University of Minnesota.
 Arndt Jorgens was a Norwegian-born catcher (1929–39), playing his entire career for the New York Yankees.
 Orville Jorgens was a pitcher for the Philadelphia Phillies (1935–37).
 John T. Joyce, Illinois businessman and state legislator
 John Komlos is a professor of economics at the University of Munich. He helped found the field of anthropometric history.
 Frankie Laine was a singer, songwriter and actor. One source notes that Laine's stage name was taken from the school.
 Ed Linke was a Major League Baseball pitcher (1933–38).
 Justina Machado is an actress (Six Feet Under, One Day at a Time, Jane the Virgin ).
 Irv Medlinger was a Major League Baseball pitcher for the St. Louis Browns (1949, 51).
 Bus Mertes was a professional football player and college head coach at Bradley, Drake and Kansas State.
 Richard W. Mies is a former U.S. Navy admiral who served as head of the United States Strategic Command.
 Donna Miller, Cook County commissioner
 Kevin Moyers is a writer (Scorn) and independent film actor.
 Ken Nordine is a voiceover and recording artist best known for his series of Word Jazz albums.
 Louis Trinca-Pasat was a football defensive tackle for the St. Louis Rams of the National Football League (NFL).
Frank Piatek is an artist and professor at the School of the Art Institute of Chicago. 
 Rachel Barton Pine is a violinist (Honorary Alumna)
 John Podesta is the former chief of staff to President Bill Clinton.
 Fritz Pollard is a member of the College Football Hall of Fame and Pro Football Hall of Fame.  He was the first African-American to be a head coach in the NFL.
Corey Postiglione is an artist and Professor Emeritus of Columbia College Chicago.
 Marty Robinson was an Emmy and Peabody Award-winning voice-over announcer at WTTW.
 Richard Schroeppel is a mathematician.
 Nadine Barrie Smith was a medical researcher.
 Jill Soloway is a 2014 Golden Globe award-winning producer and writer, known for Transparent (2014), Six Feet Under (2001) and Afternoon Delight (2013).
 Dave Spector is a television personality in Japan.
 Jim Suchecki is a former MLB player (Boston Red Sox, St. Louis Browns, Pittsburgh Pirates).
 Genndy Tartakovsky is an Emmy Award-winning animator (Dexter's Laboratory, Samurai Jack, Star Wars: Clone Wars).
 Laken Tomlinson is a guard for the San Francisco 49ers.
 Towkio is a rapper and producer.
 Dick Triptow is a former NBL and NBA player (1944–49).
 Andy Varga is a former MLB player (Chicago Cubs).
 Joe Vodicka was a football player.
 Phil Weintraub was a Major League Baseball player (1933–38, 44–45).
 Johnny Weissmuller was a five-time Olympic gold medal-winning swimmer who later became an actor, best known for his portrayal of Tarzan in the MGM film series 1932–42.
 Warren Winiarski California grape grower, founder and former winemaker of Stag's Leap Wine Cellars
 Steve Wilkos is a talk show host (The Steve Wilkos Show) and former bodyguard (Jerry Springer).
 Bob Weiland is a former MLB player (Chicago White Sox, Boston Red Sox, Cleveland Indians, St. Louis Browns, St. Louis Cardinals).
 Jim Woods is a former MLB player (Chicago Cubs, Philadelphia Phillies).
 Earl Zindars was a composer of jazz and classical music.
 Adrian Zmed is an actor (TJ Hooker, Dance Fever).

References

Further reading
 Kosell, Edward (Loyola University Chicago). "A Historical Study of Vocational Education in the Chicago Public and Technical and Vocational High Schools, 1917–1963" ([ Archive]; PhD thesis). June 1965.

External links
 
 The Champion, the school newspaper
 Lane Tech campus view from above

Educational institutions established in 1908
Public high schools in Chicago
Magnet schools in Illinois
1908 establishments in Illinois